Cheng-Tsi Song (1892–1955) was a bishop of the Sichuanese Anglican Church.
He was educated at West China Union University and ordained in 1927. He was consecrated an Assistant Bishop of Western China in St Thomas' Church, Mienchu, on 29 June 1929 and Bishop of West Szechwan in 1939.

See also 
 Protestantism in Sichuan

References 

Anglican missionary bishops in China
20th-century Anglican bishops in China
Anglican missionaries in Sichuan
Sichuanese Protestants
Diocese of Szechwan
Anglican bishops of Western China
Anglican bishops of West Szechwan
People from Chengdu
Christianity in Chengdu